Qutlugh Khwaja (d. 1299/1300) was a son of Duwa, the Mongol khan of Chagatai Khanate, division of the Mongol Empire.  He became a chief of the Qara'unas in Afghanistan after Abdullah was recalled by the Khan to Central Asia in around 1298–1299. It seems that later Ilkhans allowed him to settle with his Qaranaus in Afghanistan, though they were struggling with each other.

He launched several attacks on both the Delhi Sultanate and Ilkhanate. According to Rashid ad-Din, he was a threat to Mamluks in Delhi. In the end of 1299, a larger force under Khwaja reached the very outskirts of Delhi, leading to the Battle of Kili. Sultan Alauddin Khalji led his entire army to give battle to the Mongols — he engaged the Mongol center while his left wing broke the Mongol formation opposite them and penetrated into their rear lines. This created panic in the rest of the army and the Mongols retreated from Delhi.

Qutlugh Khwaja was mortally wounded during his return from India in 1299–1300. He was succeeded by his lieutenant Taraghai (Targhi), and then It-qul. After It-qul, Qutlugh Khwaja's son Daud Khwaja inherited his realm and soldiers.

Notes

References 
 René Grousset Empire of Steppes, Rutgers Univ Pr, New Jersey, USA, 1988

See also 
 Mongol invasions of India
 Chagatai Khanate
 Negudar

Generals of the Mongol Empire
Chagatai Khanate